Calliscelio is a parasitoid wasp monotypic genus which contains one species, C. elegans. It was first described as Caloteleia elegans on Oahu in the Hawaiian Islands in 1910 by British entomologist Robert Cyril Layton Perkins, who believed it not to be an indigenous species of Hawaii. Its pantropical species distribution is now well-established  and it is still considered to be an adventive species in Hawaii. C. elegans was reassigned from its original genus to Caenoteleia in 1926 by French entomologist Jean-Jacques Kieffer and then to Calliscelio in 2009.

References

Scelioninae
Insects of Hawaii
Insects described in 1910
Pantropical fauna
Monotypic Hymenoptera genera
Taxa named by Robert Cyril Layton Perkins